Kimberly Jan Dickens (born June 18, 1965) is an American actress. Her film debut was in the 1995 comedy film Palookaville. Dickens played lead roles in the films Truth or Consequences, N.M. (1997), Zero Effect (1998) and Mercury Rising (1998). Her other films include Great Expectations (1998), Hollow Man (2000), House of Sand and Fog (2003), Thank You for Smoking (2005), The Blind Side (2009), Gone Girl (2014), Miss Peregrine's Home for Peculiar Children (2016), Lizzie (2018), Land (2021), and The Good Nurse (2022).

On television, Dickens had regular roles in the drama series Deadwood (2004–2006; 2019), Treme (2010–2013), and House of Cards (2015–2017). She stars as Madison Clark in the AMC horror drama series Fear the Walking Dead (2015–2018; 2022–present).

Early life and education
Dickens was born in Huntsville, Alabama to Pam (Clark) Howell and Justin Dickens, a country-western singer. She graduated from that city's Lee High School and attended Vanderbilt University in Nashville, Tennessee, where she earned a Bachelor of Arts in communications. Dickens soon moved to New York City, where she worked as a waitress, to continue her studies at the Lee Strasberg Theatre and Film Institute, and graduated from the American Academy of Dramatic Arts.

Career

1990s
Dickens made her stage debut in a student production of David Mamet's Sexual Perversity in Chicago, at Vanderbilt University. In 1995, she made her professional screen debut in Alan Taylor's comedy film Palookaville, playing Vincent Gallo's character's girlfriend. Dickens spent the following year playing supporting roles in the made-for-television films Voice from the Grave and Two Mothers for Zachary. In 1997, Dickens returned to film, playing female leading role opposite Vincent Gallo again in neo-noir thriller Truth or Consequences, N.M., directed by Kiefer Sutherland. The film received negative reviews from critics. In 1998, she appeared in Great Expectations, a film adaptation of the Charles Dickens's novel, and had the female leading roles in Zero Effect and Mercury Rising. In 1999, she starred alongside Antonio Banderas in the comedy film, The White River Kid.

2000s
In 2000, Dickens had co-starring roles in films Committed opposite Heather Graham, Hollow Man with Elisabeth Shue and Kevin Bacon, and The Gift starring Cate Blanchett. The following year, she played the lead in the independent film, Things Behind the Sun. Dickens received critical acclaim for her performance, and an Independent Spirit Award for Best Female Lead nomination. Later in 2001, Dickens was a regular cast member in the short-lived CBS police drama series, Big Apple. In 2003, she co-starred opposite Felicity Huffman and Eric Stoltz in the Showtime miniseries Out of Order.

During the 2000s, Dickens mostly worked on television, playing Joanie Stubbs, the madam, in the HBO western Deadwood  from 2004 to 2006. She was nominated for the Screen Actors Guild Award for Outstanding Performance by an Ensemble in a Drama Series in 2007 for this role. She was a regular cast member in the unaired HBO comedy series, 12 Miles of Bad Road starring Lily Tomlin and Mary Kay Place. She had recurring roles on Lost and Friday Night Lights. In film, Dickens co-starred in House of Sand and Fog (2003) with Jennifer Connelly and Ben Kingsley, Thank You for Smoking (2005), Wild Tigers I Have Known (2006), Red (2008) and The Blind Side (2009).

2010s
From 2010 to 2013, Dickens was a regular on the HBO ensemble drama series, Treme, as chef Janette Desautel. From 2013 to 2014, she had a recurring role as Colette Jane in the FX crime drama, Sons of Anarchy. In 2015, she had a recurring role in the Netflix political drama House of Cards. In film, she co-starred in Footloose (2011) and At Any Price (2012). In 2014, she had a major supporting role as Detective Rhonda Boney in the psychological thriller film Gone Girl, directed by David Fincher, and in 2016, co-starred as the lead character's mother in Tim Burton's film Miss Peregrine’s Home for Peculiar Children.

In August 2015, Dickens began playing Madison Clark in The Walking Dead companion series, Fear the Walking Dead, on AMC. Dickens left the series in June 2018. She returned to the series in 2022.

2020s
Dickens appeared in the 2021 film Land.

In December 2021, it was announced on Talking Dead that Dickens would be returning to Fear the Walking Dead in the seventh season and would be a series regular in its eighth season. Dickens herself made a surprise guest appearance on the show to make the announcement to fans personally.

Personal life
Dickens moved to Los Angeles in the late 1990s. She is currently in a relationship with musician and actress Leisha Hailey, known for being a member of the musical duo The Murmurs, as well as her acting on The L Word.

Filmography

Film

Television

Video games

References

External links
 

1965 births
Living people
20th-century American actresses
21st-century American actresses
Actors from Huntsville, Alabama
Actresses from Alabama
American Academy of Dramatic Arts alumni
American film actresses
American television actresses
Lee Strasberg Theatre and Film Institute alumni
Vanderbilt University alumni
American LGBT actors
LGBT people from Alabama
LGBT actresses